The Chickahominy are a federally recognized tribe of Virginian Native Americans who primarily live in Charles City County, located along the James River midway between Richmond and Williamsburg in the Commonwealth of Virginia. This area of the Tidewater is not far from where they were living in 1600, before the arrival of colonists from England. They were officially recognized by the state in 1983 and by the federal government in January 2018.

The Eastern Chickahominy split from the main tribe in 1983 and were recognized as a separate tribe by the state that year, and by the federal government in January 2018. Neither tribe has an Indian reservation, having been displaced from their land by colonial settlement in the 17th century, but they have purchased lands that they devote to communal purposes.

Both tribes are among the 11 who have organized and been officially recognized by Virginia since 1983. Federal status was granted to the Chickahominy and Eastern Chickahominy tribes through passage of the Thomasina E. Jordan Indian Tribes of Virginia Federal Recognition Act of 2017 on January 30, 2018.

History
The Chickahominy ("The Coarse Ground Corn People") were among numerous independent Algonquian-speaking tribes who had long occupied the Tidewater area. They were led by mungai ("great men"), who were part of a council of elders and religious leaders. The Chickahominy's original territory consisted of the land along the Chickahominy River (named by the English after them), from the mouth of the river at its confluence with the James River, near Jamestown in present-day Charles City County, to what is now known as New Kent County, Virginia.

They encountered settlers from the first permanent English settlement founded at Jamestown in 1607. The tribe helped the English survive during the first few winters by trading food for English goods, as the settlers were ill-prepared for farming and developing their frontier site. The Chickahominy taught the English how to grow and preserve crops in local conditions. By 1614, the tribe had signed a treaty with the colonists; it required the tribe to provide 300 warriors to fight the Spanish, which had an established colony in Florida and the lower East Coast.

Over time, the English began to expand their settlements and crowded out the Chickahominy from their homeland. The peoples had earlier come into conflict over uses of land, as the Chickahominy expected to travel freely for hunting, and the English wanted to preserve some property as private.  Following the Anglo-Powhatan Wars of 1644–46, the tribe was forced to cede most of its land to gain a peace treaty. The tribe resettled on reservation land set aside by the treaty in the Pamunkey Neck area, alongside another Virginia Algonquian tribe, the Pamunkey, between the Mattaponi and Pamunkey Rivers.

They stayed there until 1661, when they moved again to the headwaters of the Mattaponi, but their reserved holdings continued to be encroached upon by the expanding English colony. In 1677, the Chickahominy were among the tribes signing a peace treaty with the King of England.

The people lost title to the last part of their reservation lands in 1718, but continued to live in the area for some time. Those who did not merge with the Pamunkey and other tribes, slowly migrated back to New Kent County and Charles City County, closer to their original homeland. In the 20th century, descendants of these people organized to form the current Eastern Chickahominy and Chickahominy tribes, respectively. The migrations happened before the end of the 18th century, and few records survive in this "burnt-over district," disrupted by major wars, by which to establish their dates of migration.

While independent, the Chickahominy were at times allied in the 17th century with Chief Powhatan, and his paramount chiefdom, a confederacy of 30 or so Algonquian-speaking tribes. Records found within The National Archives (TNA) at Kew, West London, indicate the Chickahominy tribe may have served in a "police" role, used by Powhatan to quell rivalries and bring an end to infighting amongst other confederacy tribes. In return, they enjoyed some benefits, such as trading with the confederacy tribes. As part of the alliance between Powhatan's confederacy and the Chickahominy, it appears they were to act as a buffer "warrior force" between the confederacy tribes and other less friendly or hostile tribes in the event of an attack, thus giving Powhatan's forces time to mobilize. Some 20th-century sources say the Chickahominy joined the Powhatan Confederacy in 1616. Others contend they did not become tributaries of the paramount chiefdom until 1677, when Cockacoeske signed the Treaty of Middle Plantation.  The treaty acknowledged her as leader of the Chickahominy and several other tribes.

Chickahominy today
In the early 21st century, the Chickahominy tribe consists of about 840 people who live within a five-mile (8-km) radius of each other and the tribal center, in an area known as Chickahominy Ridge. Several hundred more live in other parts of the United States, including California, Florida, New York, Oklahoma, South Carolina, West Virginia and Pennsylvania. The tribal center on the land is the location of an annual Powwow and Fall Festival.

The Chickahominy are led by a tribal council of 12 men and women, including a chief and two assistant chiefs.  These positions are elected by members of the tribe, by vote.  The current chief is Stephen Adkins. He served as Director of Human Resources for the Commonwealth of Virginia in the administration of Governor Tim Kaine. Wayne Adkins is an assistant chief, along with Reggie Stewart.

Most members of the Chickahominy Tribe are Christian; many attend Samaria Baptist Church, formerly called Samaria Indian Church, in Charles City County. The church was built upon tribal grounds and once served as a school for the children of the tribe. The church is located directly across from the tribal headquarters.

Eastern Chickahominy
The people of the Chickahominy Tribe Eastern Division shared a history with the Chickahominy until the late 20th century, when they decided to organize their own tribal government.  As their community was based in New Kent County, some found it inconvenient always to travel to Charles City County for tribal meetings.  Others say the split happened because of disagreements over religious practice and land use. Family ties have kept the two tribes intertwined.

Tribe members have served in the United States military since World War I.  The tribe serves the needs of its community as a nontaxable organization. This is supported through contributions and from members who pay dues.

Efforts at recognition
The Chickahominy were recognized on January 11, 2018. U.S. Senators Tim Kaine and Mark Warner secured passage of the Thomasina E. Jordan Indian Tribes of Virginia Federal Recognition Act of 2017.

Once signed by then President Donald J Trump, the legislation granted federal recognition of the following six Virginia tribes: the Chickahominy, the Eastern Chickahominy, the Upper Mattaponi, the Rappahannock, the Monacan, and the Nansemond. Since the 1990s, the tribes had been seeking federal recognition through an act of Congress.

In March 2009, Representative Jim Moran of Virginia sponsored a bill to grant federal recognition to six Virginia Indian "landless" tribes: the Chickahominy, Eastern Chickahominy, Nansemond, Rappahannock Tribe, Upper Mattaponi, and the Monacan Nation.  By June the bill had passed the House of Representatives. A day after it was voted on in the House, a companion bill was sent to the Senate.  The Senate referred this bill to their Committee on Indian Affairs, which approved the bill on October 22, 2009.  On December 23, 2009, the Senate added the bill to its legislative calendar. This is the farthest the bill has gotten in the congressional process.  This effort has been supported by the Commonwealth of Virginia, and executives of the Baptist Church, among other groups.

The bill was opposed by Senator Tom Coburn (R-OK), who cited "jurisdictional concerns". The senator believes requests for tribal recognition should be processed through the Bureau of Indian Affairs (BIA). Moran and others support the congressional process in part because the Virginia tribes lost their continuity of records due to discriminatory actions of the state government that destroyed their records of Indian identity, under the changes resulting from the Racial Integrity Act of 1924 and the orders of Walter Plecker, the state registrar for the Bureau of Vital Statistics at the time.

The Pamunkey and Mattaponi, also state-recognized, gained recognition in separate processes, through the BIA's administrative process. They believed their continuing residency on and control of their reservations demonstrated their historical continuity as tribes.

Working to improve its process, in 2013, the BIA announced proposed changes to regulations, which include allowing tribes to document a shorter timeframe to establish historical continuity. This has the potential of making it easier for tribes to establish recent historical continuity and gain recognition, as well as to speed up the bureau's review of documentation.

References

External links
Official Site of the Chickahominy Tribe
Chickahominy information from Virginia Council on Indians
Chickahominy Indians, Eastern Division information from Virginia Council on Indians

Native American tribes in Virginia
Federally recognized tribes in the United States
Powhatan Confederacy
Algonquian ethnonyms
State-recognized tribes in the United States